Bonnie Doon is a town in Victoria, Australia. It is located on the Maroondah Highway, in the Shire of Mansfield. Bonnie Doon is 168 kilometres north-east from Melbourne. At the 2016 census, Bonnie Doon township had a population of 570.

History 
The township was established subsequent to gold discoveries in the area. It was originally named Doon after the town of that name in Ireland.
The Post Office opened on 1 October 1866 and was renamed Bonnie Doon in 1891 coinciding with the arrival of the railway.

Much of the original town of Bonnie Doon was flooded by the construction of Lake Eildon in the 1950s. The township was relocated; some buildings were picked up and moved, whilst others were able to remain in their original site, such as the churches.

Tourism

Lake Eildon makes Bonnie Doon a minor tourist town for water activities, and the surrounds of Bonnie Doon, which has a rail trail, are somewhat popular for weekend holidaymakers. This popularity was satirised in the Australian comedy, The Castle, with popular quotes such as "How's the serenity?" and its catch-phrase song "We're going to Bonnie Doon".

Lake

References

External links

Bonnie Doon Community
Great Victorian Rail Trail
Australian Places - Bonnie Doon
Goulburn River High Country Rail Trail

Towns in Victoria (Australia)
Shire of Mansfield